Joey Mantia (born February 7, 1986) is an American speed skater and inline speed skater, an Olympic bronze medalist, 28-time world champion, and a world record holder. He also won two gold medals at the 2003 Pan American Games and a gold medal at the 2007 Pan American Games. He won the American Speed Skater of the Year award three times in a row, in 2005, 2006, and 2007, and the 2007 Elmer Ringeisen Sportsmanship Award. In October 2010, after winning two world titles at the inline skating championships in Colombia, he was ranked second among male competitors in the USOC Athlete of the Month competition.

As of January 7, 2010, Mantia held the world records for the road race over 500 m (38.6 seconds), 10,000 m (13 minutes, 46.801 seconds), and 20,000 m (28 minutes, 56.189 seconds), and the world records for the track race over 300 m (24.250 seconds) and 15,000 m (22 minutes, 32.644 seconds).

Early life
Joey Mantia started skating on rollerblades as a self-described "rink rat," often asking his parents to bring him to the local indoor skating rink. He spent a lot of time at public skating sessions and learned about speed skating by watching inline skating practice at the rink. After experiencing inline speed skating, Mantia decided to dedicate his life to "becoming the best speed skater in the world".

Speed skating career
In 2010, Mantia switched from inline speed skating to speed skating on ice.  He first moved to the Olympic Training Center in Colorado Springs, Colorado, then to Salt Lake City, Utah, to train with the national team two years later. Mantia finished fourth at the 2011 US speed skating championships over 5000 m, tenth in the 1000 m and eighth in the 1500 m.

In early 2013, Mantia made his debut on the World Cup competition circuit. He found success less than a year later, at the Berlin World Cup in December 2013, where he finished first in the 1500 m, beating out his teammate Shani Davis, a two-time Olympic silver medalist in the 1500 m, and Russia's Denis Yuskov, the reigning world champion, to win gold.

Mantia represented Team USA at the 2014 Sochi Winter Olympics, where he finished 15th in the 1000 m, 22nd in the 1500 m, and 7th in the team pursuit. In January 2018, Mantia qualified for the 2018 U.S. Olympic Team, winning the 1000 m and 1500 m events. He also qualified for the mass start.

On December 13, 2021, Mantia won his second-straight 1500m World Cup title in Salt Lake City.

His first Olympic medal was a bronze in the team pursuit with the U.S. team at the 2022 Winter Olympics in Beijing.

Personal records

As of January 17, 2018, his ranking on the all-time Adelskalender is 65th.

Personal life
Mantia is an investor and owner in Coffee Lab, a coffee shop located on the University of Utah campus. In his free time, Mantia taught himself to play piano.

Sponsorships
Mantia has appeared in XFINITY commercials, and a Giorgio Armani short film entitled The Scent of Life by Acqua di Giò – Joey Mantia – Episode 2.

References

External links

Team USA Athlete Bio

1986 births
Living people
American male speed skaters
American roller skaters
Inline speed skaters
Speed skaters at the 2014 Winter Olympics
Speed skaters at the 2018 Winter Olympics
Speed skaters at the 2022 Winter Olympics
Medalists at the 2022 Winter Olympics
Olympic bronze medalists for the United States in speed skating
Pan American Games gold medalists for the United States
Pan American Games medalists in roller skating
Roller speed skaters at the 2003 Pan American Games
Roller speed skaters at the 2007 Pan American Games
World Single Distances Speed Skating Championships medalists
Sportspeople from Ocala, Florida
Medalists at the 2003 Pan American Games
Medalists at the 2007 Pan American Games